Arman is a 1953 Indian Hindi-language romantic drama film directed and produced by Fali Mistry. The music is composed by S. D. Burman. Arman revolves around Radha (Madhubala), a peasant girl who is fostered by her dead father's loyal servant Ramdas (Jagirdar) so that she does not fall in clutches of her treacherous uncle Bahadur Singh (K. N. Singh). Dev Anand stars as Radha's love interest Madan.

Arman was theatrically released on 19 August 1953 and received mixed reviews from critics. Madhubala's and Jagirdar's performances were praised; but the music and Anand's performance were sharply criticised. Nevertheless, the film became a box office success. Since no print of the film is known to survive today, Arman is considered lost today.

Plot 
Ramdas, a poor noble soul (Jagirdar) rears up the only daughter of his dead master away from his own home so that she may not fall into the clutches of her treacherous uncle, Bahadur Singh (K. N. Singh). Baby Radha grows up to be a beautiful girl (Madhubala) and falls in love with the poet Madan (Dev Anand), who happens to visit her village. Fate separates them and Radha is taken over by her uncle and taught to outgrow her peasant upbringing to become a swell girl. But her love for her foster father, now a dispiriterd rickshaw puller, flames again leading up to a climax.

Cast 
Dev Anand as Madan
Madhubala as Radha
Shakila as Roopa
K. N. Singh as Bahadur Singh 
Jagirdar as Ramdas

Soundtrack
All music was composed by S. D. Burman.

Release

Critical reception 
A review by The Indian Express in October 1953 appreciated the performances by Madhubala and Jagirdar and also the music, in contrast to a review by Cineplot, which called it "too frequently hybrid". Regarding Madhubala, the critic commented that she "puts her part over with an allure, charm and sensitivity which are astoundingly, good." Cineplot concluded: "Armaan makes for pleasurable entertainment despite its lack of logical cohesion due to the haphazard development of the key roles and the illogical actions of the characters." Thought was critical of the film's storyline, calling it a "sentimentalized rehash of a mediocre story", and Anand's performance, saying that he possesses "limited acting skills".

Box office 
The Indian Express reported in October 1953 that the film is running to packed houses. At the end of its theatrical run, Armaan grossed 2.9 million at the box office to emerge as the ninth most successful film of 1953.

References

External links

1953 films
Indian romantic drama films
1950s Hindi-language films
Films scored by S. D. Burman
Films directed by Fali Mistry